Harish Chandra Shakya better known as Harish Shakya is an Indian politician and current MLA representing Bilsi (Assembly constituency). He won 2022 Uttar Pradesh Legislative Assembly election from Bhartiya Janta Party. He is the former BJP Backward Class Front State President from Budaun district.

Political career
Harish Shakya started his career in 1998 from Akhil Bharatiya Vidyarthi Parishad as district head. He was the district president of Bharatiya Janata Yuva Morcha from 2004 to 2007.

In 2008 Shakya was appointed BJP District General Secretary and in 2016 the party appointed him as BJP district chief from Budaun district. He served this position till 2019.

In 2022, he was elected as Member of the Legislative Assembly from Bilsi (Assembly constituency) and won 2022 Uttar Pradesh Legislative Assembly election with 45.54% votes margin.

Electoral performance

References

Bharatiya Janata Party politicians from Uttar Pradesh
Yogi ministry
Living people
Year of birth missing (living people)